Five Stories Falling is a five-song EP released by Thursday in 2002. The first four tracks are live versions of songs from Full Collapse, recorded while the band performed on the Vans Warped Tour. The fifth track, a new song named "Jet Black New Year", quickly became popular amongst fans; the song featured Gerard Way of My Chemical Romance performing screamed background vocals. The EP also featured stories by each of the band members, including touring (and now permanent) keyboardist Andrew Everding.

On their UK Tour in 2006, when introducing the song "Jet Black New Year", lead singer Geoff Rickly publicly urged the crowd present not to purchase this E.P. but to download "Jet Black New Year" instead.

It reached #197 on the Billboard 200.

Tracks

Personnel
Geoff Rickly - vocals
Tucker Rule - drums, backing vocals
Tom Keeley - lead guitar, backing vocals
Tim Payne - bass, backing vocals
Steve Pedulla - rhythm guitar, backing vocals
Gerard Way - backing vocals on "Jet Black New Year"
Sal Villanueva - production, engineering
Rumblefish - mixing

References

2002 EPs
Thursday (band) albums
Albums produced by Sal Villanueva